Sergej Schmik (born 27 November 1989) is a German former professional footballer and coach who is assistant manager of SC Verl. He played as a full-back and had a spell in the 2. Bundesliga with SC Paderborn 07.

Career
After starting his career at SC Paderborn 07, Schmik joined SV Wilhelmshaven in the summer of 2012. He left Wilhemshaven in January 2013 to join SV Meppen. In the summer of 2014, he signed for Hessen Kassel. After making over 100 appearances for the club over a four-year period, Schmik signed for SC Verl in summer 2018. In 2020 Schmik became the assistant manager at SC Verl alongside his playing duties.

References

External links
 
 
 

1972 births
Living people
German footballers
Association football defenders
People from Pavlodar
SC Paderborn 07 players
SV Wilhelmshaven players
SV Meppen players
KSV Hessen Kassel players
SC Verl players
2. Bundesliga players
Regionalliga players